Spearfield's Daughter is a 1982 novel written by Australian author Jon Cleary.

Adaptation
The book was adapted into a 1986 Australian-Canadian mini series starring Christopher Plummer. Cleary's original scripts were rewritten and he describes the result as a "disaster".

References

External links
Spearfield's Daughter (mini series) at IMDb
Spearfield's Daughter at AustLit (subscription required)

1982 Australian novels
Novels set in Vietnam
Novels about journalists
William Collins, Sons books
William Morrow and Company books
Novels by Jon Cleary